One Is Guilty is a 1934 American pre-Code mystery crime film directed by Lambert Hillyer and starring Ralph Bellamy, Shirley Grey and Rita La Roy. It is the second in a series of four films featuring Bellamy as Inspector Steve Trent following Before Midnight. Two further films The Crime of Helen Stanley and Girl in Danger were released later in the year.

Synopsis
The body of a champion boxer is found in an apartment complex. Various suspects appear to have had the opportunity and the motive to kill the fighter.

Cast
 Ralph Bellamy as Police Inspector Steve Trent
 Shirley Grey as Sally Grey
 Warren Hymer as 	'Knock-Out' Walters
 Rita La Roy as 	Lola Deveroux
 J. Carrol Naish as 	Jack Allen
 Wheeler Oakman as Toledo Eddie Marchetti
 Ruth Abbott as 	Miss Mabel Kane
 Willard Robertson as Wells Deveroux
 Ralph Remley as 'Pop' Daley
 Vincent Sherman as William Malcolm
 Harry Todd as Danny O'Keefe
 Sam Flint as 	Coroner

References

Bibliography
 Backer, Ron. Mystery Movie Series of 1930s Hollywood. McFarland, 2012.

External links
 

1934 films
1934 crime films
1934 mystery films
American crime films
American mystery films
Films directed by Lambert Hillyer
American black-and-white films
Columbia Pictures films
1930s English-language films
1930s American films